Bulgargaz  is the largest Bulgarian natural gas distribution company. It is a subsidiary of Bulgarian Energy Holding EAD, a holding company established on 18 September 2008.  As of November 2009 the company is listed on the Bulgarian Stock Exchange - Sofia.

References

External links

 Official site
 Financial Statements

Oil and gas companies of Bulgaria